The Worldwide Skyraider S/S, also called the SkyRaider S/S, is an American ultralight aircraft that was designed and produced by Worldwide Ultralite Industries in the early 1980s. The aircraft was supplied as a kit for amateur construction.

Design and development
It features a cable-braced high-wing, a wide single-seat, open cockpit, tricycle landing gear and a single engine in pusher configuration.

The aircraft is made from aluminum tubing, with the wings and tail surfaces covered in Dacron sailcloth. Its  span wing is cable braced from a single kingpost. The standard Kawasaki 440  engine is mounted at the trailing edge of the wing, with the rearwards-facing propeller in between the tail boom tubing.

Specifications (Skyraider S/S)

References

External links
Photo of a Skyraider S/S

1980s United States ultralight aircraft
Homebuilt aircraft
Single-engined pusher aircraft
Worldwide Ultralite aircraft